Country Classics may refer to:

 Country Classics (Juice Newton album)
 Country Classics (Slim Dusty album)
 Country Classics: A Tapestry of Our Musical Heritage, an album by Joey + Rory